The 2018 Open d'Orléans was a professional tennis tournament played on indoor hard courts. It was the fourteenth edition of the tournament which was part of the 2018 ATP Challenger Tour. It took place in Orléans, France between 24 and 30 September 2018.

Singles main-draw entrants

Seeds

 1 Rankings are as of 17 September 2018.

Other entrants
The following players received wildcards into the singles main draw:
  Aljaž Bedene
  Antoine Cornut Chauvinc
  Antoine Hoang
  Sergiy Stakhovsky

The following players received entry from the qualifying draw:
  Hugo Nys
  Arthur Rinderknech
  Emil Ruusuvuori
  Tak Khunn Wang

The following players received entry as lucky losers:
  Maxime Janvier
  Tim van Rijthoven
  Tobias Simon

Champions

Singles

 Aljaž Bedene def.  Antoine Hoang 4–6, 6–1, 7–6(8–6).

Doubles

 Luke Bambridge /  Jonny O'Mara def.  Yannick Maden /  Tristan-Samuel Weissborn 6–2, 6–4.

External links
Official Website